Pibgorn may refer to:
 Pibgorn (instrument), a Welsh musical instrument of the hornpipe family
 Pibgorn (webcomic)